"Nothing Like This" is a song by English deep house duo Blonde, with English singer Craig David. It serves as the second single from his sixth studio album, Following My Intuition (2016). It received its debut airplay on Capital FM on 17 March 2016 and was released by Parlophone and FFRR Records the following day. The song debuted at number 17 on the UK Singles Chart and peaked at number 15.

Track listing

Charts

Weekly charts

Year-end charts

Certifications

Release history

References

2016 singles
2016 songs
Blonde (duo) songs
Craig David songs
Parlophone singles
Songs written by Craig David
FFRR Records singles
Songs written by Jacob Manson
UK garage songs
Song recordings produced by Mark Ralph (record producer)